The ornate melidectes or ornate honeyeater (Melidectes torquatus) is a species of bird in the family Meliphagidae.
It is found in the New Guinea Highlands.
Its natural habitat is subtropical or tropical moist montane forest.

References

ornate melidectes
Birds of New Guinea
ornate melidectes
ornate melidectes
Taxonomy articles created by Polbot